Terence Michael McRae (11 January 1941 – 5 August 2006) was an Australian politician and lawyer. He was a member of the Labor Party and member for the South Australian House of Assembly seat of Playford from 1970 to 1989.

Early life
McRae was born in 1941 to Irish Australian parents. He went to school at Saint Ignatius' College then studied law at the University of Adelaide and was admitted to the bar in 1963.

Politics
McRae first attempted to get elected to the seat of Torrens in 1968 but was defeated. He was successful at being elected to Playford in 1970.

As Speaker of the South Australian House of Assembly from 1982 to 1986 for the John Bannon Labor government he was responsible for the introduction of television coverage to South Australian Parliament.

Later life
After leaving parliament he resumed his law career. McRae died in 2006 while watching a football game at AAMI Stadium. He was survived by his wife Doreen and three children Jeremy, Sarah and Rebecca.

References

1941 births
2006 deaths
Australian Labor Party members of the Parliament of South Australia
Members of the South Australian House of Assembly
Speakers of the South Australian House of Assembly
20th-century Australian politicians